High Lane is a village in the Metropolitan Borough of Stockport, Greater Manchester, England, on the Macclesfield Canal,  from Stockport.

Governance
High Lane lies in the Marple South and High Lane ward of Stockport Metropolitan Borough Council. It is in the Hazel Grove parliamentary constituency and, since 2015, the Member of Parliament is William Wragg of the Conservative party.

Geography
It is bordered by the villages of Marple to the north; Hazel Grove to the west; Disley to the east and Poynton to the south. Most of the village is spread along the A6 road, which connects Luton and Carlisle.

High Lane lies in the foothills of the Pennines and, on clear days, it affords some excellent views of the city of Manchester and surrounding towns.

Demography 
The population is 5,852. 95% of the population are White British. 82% of the population give their religion as Christian, and 9.8% have no religion. 64% of the population are economically active; 24% are retired.

Social class:
 Higher managerial and professional – 11%
 Lower managerial and professional – 21%
 Intermediate occupations – 11%
 Small employers and own account workers – 9.6%
 Lower supervisory and technical – 5.3%
 Semi-routine – 8.0%
 Routine – 4.8%
 Never worked and long-term unemployed – 1.3%

Landmarks
There is a Grade II listed war memorial in the centre of the village, close to the church of St Thomas (also Grade II listed). The Old Court House (dated 1772) is one of a few older houses along the main road. At the edge of the village is Wybersley Hall. High Lane War Memorial Village Hall sits within High Lane Park, overlooking two junior football pitches.

Transport
The A6, a major trunk road in England connecting Luton in the south with Carlisle in the north, runs through High Lane.

The nearest railway station to High Lane is Middlewood, which is on the Buxton line connecting Manchester Piccadilly and Stockport with the Peak District. Services are generally two-hourly in both directions. The very long Disley Tunnel, on the Hope Valley Line, passes underneath the village.

High Lane had its own railway station, on the Macclesfield, Bollington and Marple Railway which connected Rose Hill Marple with Macclesfield. It was closed, as part of the Beeching cuts, in January 1970.  The route is now a linear park, called the Middlewood Way, which is accessible from the A6.

The Macclesfield Canal passes through High Lane. The  High Lane Arm of the Macclesfield Canal is the home of the North Cheshire Cruising Club. The Arm historically had extended south  to the Middlewood coal mine.

Education
High Lane has two primary schools: High Lane Primary School and Brookside Primary School.

Religious sites

 St Thomas' Church – Anglican. Built 1851; consecrated 1859; enlarged 1866. In modern Norman style, Grade II listed.
 Windlehurst Methodist Church – Methodist

Public services
There are three parks in High Lane: Brookside Park, Windlehurst Park and High Lane Park. Windlehurst Park is known to many locals as "the little park". High Lane Park is the largest and, in 2000, had a small skatepark installed. In the summer of 2010, renovations were completed and an extension to the children's play area was constructed.

Notable residents
 John Bradshaw (1602–59) President of the High Court of Justice (1649) (Judge) for the trial of Charles I. Lord President of the  Council of State of the English Commonwealth 1649–51, 1653  
 Christopher Isherwood – author
 Sir Nicholas Winstanley – author and priest
 Christopher Samba – former Blackburn Rovers football club captain
 Daniel Pepper – Paralympian swimmer

See also

Listed buildings in Marple, Greater Manchester

References

External links

High Lane Village Community Website

Villages in Greater Manchester
Towns and villages of the Peak District
Geography of the Metropolitan Borough of Stockport